An academic discipline or field of study is known as a branch of knowledge. It is taught as an accredited part of higher education. A scholar's discipline is commonly defined and recognized by a university faculty. That person will be accredited by learned societies to which they belong along with the academic journals in which they publish. However, no formal criteria exist for defining an academic discipline.
 
Disciplines vary between universities and even programs. These will have well-defined rosters of journals and conferences supported by a few universities and publications. Most disciplines are broken down into (potentially overlapping) branches called sub-disciplines.

There is no consensus on how some academic disciplines should be classified (e.g., whether anthropology and linguistics are disciplines of social sciences or fields within the humanities). More generally, the proper criteria for organizing knowledge into disciplines are also open to debate.

Humanities and social science

Anthropology 

 Anthropological criminology
 Anthropological linguistics
 Synchronic linguistics (or Descriptive linguistics)
 Diachronic linguistics (or Historical linguistics)
 Ethnolinguistics
 Semiotic anthropology
 Sociolinguistics
 Anthrozoology
 Biological anthropology
 Gene-culture coevolution
 Evolutionary anthropology
 Forensic anthropology
 Human behavioral ecology
 Human evolution
 Medical anthropology
 Molecular anthropology
 Neuroanthropology
 Nutritional anthropology
 Paleoanthropology
 Population genetics
 Primatology
 Biocultural anthropology

 Cultural anthropology
 Anthropology of development
 Anthropology of religion
 Applied anthropology
 Cognitive anthropology
 Cyborg anthropology
 Digital anthropology
 Digital culture
 Ecological anthropology
 Economic anthropology
 Environmental anthropology
 Ethnobiology
 Ethnobotany
 Ethnography
 Ethnohistory
 Ethnology
 Ethnomuseology
 Ethnomusicology
 Feminist anthropology
 Folklore
 Kinship
 Legal anthropology
 Mythology
 Missiology
 Political anthropology
 Political economic anthropology
 Psychological anthropology
 Public anthropology
 Symbolic anthropology
 Transpersonal anthropology
 Urban anthropology
 Linguistic anthropology
 Social anthropology
 Anthropology of art
 Anthropology of institutions
 Anthropology of media
 Visual anthropology

Archaeology 

 Aerial archaeology
 Aviation archaeology
 Anthracology
 Archaeo-optics
 Archaeoacoustics
 Archaeoastronomy
 Archaeogeography
 Archaeological culture
 Archaeological theory
 Great ages archaeology
 Functionalism
 Processualism 
 Post-processualism
 Cognitive archaeology
 Gender archaeology
 Feminist archaeology
 Archaeometry
 Archaeogenetics
 Bioarchaeology
 Computational archaeology
 Dendrochronology
 Geoarchaeology
 Isotope analysis
 Palynology
 Radiocarbon dating
 Zooarchaeology
 Archaeology of religion and ritual
 Archaeology of trade
 Archaeomythology
 Architectural analytics
 Battlefield archaeology
 Calceology
 Conflict archaeology
 Data archaeology
 Digital archaeology
 Experimental archaeology
 Environmental archaeology
 Ethnoarchaeology
 Forensic archaeology
 Glyptology
 History of archaeology
 Household archaeology
 Landscape archaeology and Landscape history
 Manuscriptology
 Maritime archaeology
 Media archaeology
 Modern archaeology
 Settlement archaeology
 Music archaeology
 Osteology
 Palaeoarchaeology
 Paleoanthropology
 Paleoethnobotany
 Paleopathology
 Paleoradiology
 Taphonomy
 Urban archaeology
 Historical archaeology
 Prehistoric archaeology
 protohistoric archaeology
 Biblical archaeology
 Classical archaeology
 Egyptology
 Assyriology
 Etruscology
 Near Eastern archaeology
 Medieval archaeology
 Post-medieval archaeology
 Industrial archaeology
 Contemporary archaeology
 African archaeology
 Australian archaeology
 European archaeology
 Russian archaeology
 Archaeology of the Americas
 Archaeology of China
 Archaeology of Israel

History 

 African history
 South African history
 Egyptian history
East and Central African history
 Nigerian history
 Pan-American history
 North American history
 American history
 Canadian history
 Mexican history
 Cuban history
 South American history
 Latin American history
 Brazilian history
 Colombian history
 Venezuelan history
 Peruvian history
 Argentine history
 Pre-Columbian era
 Mayan history
 Aztec history
 Inca history
 Mississippian culture
 Ancient history
 Ancient Greek history (outline)
 Ancient Roman history (outline)
 History of the Roman Republic
 History of the Roman Empire
 Ancient Egyptian history (outline)
 Ancient Chinese history (outline)
 Ancient Middle Eastern history
 Asian history
 Chinese history
 Japanese history
 Korean history
 Mongolian history
 Indian history (outline)
 Turkish history
 Iranian history
 Philippine history
 Indonesian history
 European history
 British history
 French history
 German history
 Dutch history
 Italian history
 Spanish history
 Portuguese history
 Polish history
 Balkan history
 Scandinavian history
 Swedish history
 Norwegian history
 Danish history
 Finnish history
 Icelandic history
 Russian history
 Australian history
 Economic history
 Environmental history
 Intellectual history
 Modern history
 Political history
 Scientific history
 Technological history
 World history
 Public history

Linguistics and languages 

 Classics (outline)
 Languages
 Business English
 Classical language
 Modern language
 Standard English
 World Englishes
 Applied linguistics
 Comics studies
 Composition studies
 Computational linguistics
 Discourse analysis
 English studies
 Etymology
 Grammar
 Historical linguistics
 History of linguistics
 Interlinguistics
 Lexicology
 Linguistic typology
 Morphology
 Natural language processing
 Philology
 Phonetics
 Phonology
 Pragmatics
 Psycholinguistics
 Semantics
 Semiotics (outline)
 Sociolinguistics
 Syntax
 Terminology science
 Rhetoric
 Usage
 Word usage

Philosophy 

 Meta-philosophy
 Metaphysics (outline)
 Ontology
 Teleology
 Philosophy of mind
 Philosophy of artificial intelligence
 Philosophy of perception
 Philosophy of pain
 Philosophy of space and time
 Philosophy of action
 Determinism and Free will
 Epistemology (outline)
 Justification
 Reasoning errors
 Ethics (outline)
 Meta-ethics
 Normative ethics
 Virtue ethics
 Applied ethics
 Animal rights
 Bioethics
 Environmental ethics
 Moral psychology, Descriptive ethics, Value theory
 Aesthetics (outline) / Philosophy of art
 Social philosophy and Political philosophy
 Anarchism (outline)
 Feminist philosophy
 Libertarianism (outline)
 Marxism
 Philosophical traditions and schools
 Platonism
 Aristotelianism
 Analytic philosophy
 Continental philosophy
 Eastern philosophy
 Feminist philosophy
 History of philosophy
 Ancient philosophy
 Medieval philosophy
 Scholasticism
 Humanism (outline)
 Modern philosophy
 Contemporary philosophy
 Logic (outline)
 Philosophical logic
 Mathematical logic
 Applied philosophy
 Philosophy of education
 Philosophy of history
 Philosophy of religion
 Philosophy of language
 Philosophy of law
 Philosophy of mathematics
 Philosophy of music
 Philosophy of science
 Philosophy of social science
 Philosophy of physics
 Philosophy of biology
 Philosophy of chemistry
 Philosophy of economics
 Philosophy of psychology
 Philosophy of engineering
 Systems philosophy

Religion 

 Abrahamic religions
 Christianity (outline)
 Christian theology (outline)
 Islam (outline)/ Islamic studies
 Judaism (outline)/ Jewish studies
 Apologetics
 Indian religions
 Buddhism (outline)/ Buddhist studies
 Hinduism (outline)
 Jainism
 Sikhism (outline)
 East Asian religions
 Chinese folk religion
 Confucianism
 Shinto
 Daoism (outline)
 I-Kuan Tao
 Caodaism
 Chondogyo
 Tenrikyo
 Oomoto
 Other religions
 African religions
 Ancient Egyptian religion
 Native American religions
 Gnosticism
 Occult
 Esotericism
 Mysticism
 Spirituality
 New religious movements
 Sumerian religion
 Zoroastrianism
 Comparative religion
 Mythology and Folklore
 Theism
 Irreligion
 Agnosticism
 Atheism (outline) and religious humanism
 Nontheism

The arts

Culinary arts 

 Acquired taste
 Aftertaste
 Appetite
 Artisanal food
 Cooking
 Cuisine
 Culinary arts
 Culinary tourism
 Delicacy
 Diet
 Flavor
 Food choice
 Food pairing
 Food photography
 Food preparation
 Food presentation
 Food safety
 Food security
 Food studies
 Gastronomy
 Gourmet
 Palatability
 Specialty foods
 Traditional food

Literature 

 Poetry
 Comparative literature
 English literature
 World literature
 American literature
 British literature
 History of literature
 Medieval literature
 Post-colonial literature
 Post-modern literature
 Literary theory
 Critical theory (outline)
 Literary criticism
 Poetics
 Rhetoric
 Literary genre
 Creative writing
Creative nonfiction
 Fiction writing  (outline)
 Non-fiction writing
 Literary journalism
 Poetry 
 Screenwriting
 Playwrighting

Performing arts 

 Music (outline)
 Accompanying
 Chamber music
 Church music
 Musical composition
 Conducting
 Choral conducting
 Orchestral conducting
 Wind ensemble conducting
 Early music
 Jazz studies (outline)
 Music education
 Music history
 Music genre
 Music theory
 Musicology
 Historical musicology
 Systematic musicology
 Ethnomusicology
 Organology
 Organ and historical keyboards
 Piano
 Strings, harp, oud, and guitar (outline)
 Singing
 Woodwinds, brass, and percussion
 Recording
 Orchestral studies
 Dance (outline)
 Choreography
 Dance notation
 Ethnochoreology
 History of dance
 Television (outline)
 Television studies
 Theatre (outline)
 History
 Acting
 Directing
 Stage design
Puppetry
 Dramaturgy
 Scenography
 Musical theatre
 Film (outline)
 Animation
 Live action
 Filmmaking
 Film criticism
 Film genre
 Film studies
 Film theory
 Oral literature
 Public speaking
 Performance poetry
 Spoken word
 Storytelling
 Electronic game
 Arcade game
 Audio game
 Outline of video games

Visual arts 

 Craft
 Fine arts
 Forgery
 Graphic design
 Graphic arts
 Drawing (outline)
 Painting (outline)
 Photography (outline)
 Sculpture (outline)

Economics 

 Agricultural economics
 Anarchist economics
Applied economics
 Behavioural economics
 Bioeconomics
 Business
 Complexity economics
 Computational economics
 Consumer economics
 Development economics
 Digital economy
 Ecological economics
 Econometrics
 Economic geography
 Economic history
 Economic sector
 Economic sociology
 Economic systems
 Economic value
 Energy economics
 Entrepreneurial economics
 Environmental economics
 Evolutionary economics
 Experimental economics
 Feminist economics
 Financial economics
 Financial econometrics
 Green economics
 Growth economics
 Human development theory
 Industrial organization
 Information economics
 Institutional economics
 International economics
 Islamic economics
 JEL classification codes in searching for articles by fields in economics journals 
 Knowledge economy
 Labor economics
 Law and economics
 Macroeconomics
 Managerial economics
 Market economy
 Marxian economics
 Mathematical economics
 Microeconomics
 Monetary economics
 Neuroeconomics
 Participatory economics
 Political economy
 Public finance
 Public economics
 Real estate economics
 Resource economics
 Social choice theory
 Socialist economics
 Socioeconomics
 Transport economics
 Welfare economics

Geography 

 Cartography (outline)
 Navigation
 Human geography
 Cultural geography
 Feminist geography
 Economic geography
 Development geography
 Historical geography
 Time geography
 Political geography & geopolitics
 Military geography
 Strategic geography
 Population geography
 Social geography
 Behavioral geography
 Children's geographies
 Health geography
 Tourism geography
 Urban geography
 Environmental geography
 Physical geography
 Biogeography
 Climatology
 Palaeoclimatology
 Coastal geography
 Geomorphology
 Geodesy
 Hydrology/Hydrography
 Glaciology
 Limnology
 Biogeochemistry
 Oceanography
 Landscape ecology
 Palaeogeography
 Regional geography
 Remote sensing

Interdisciplinary studies

Area studies 

 African studies
 American studies
 Appalachian studies
 Canadian studies
 Latin American studies
 Asian studies
 Central Asian studies
 East Asian studies
 Iranian studies
 Japanology (Japanese studies)
 Korean studies
 Sinology (outline) (Chinese studies)
 South Asian studies (Indology)
 Dravidology
 Pakistan studies
 Sindhology
 Southeast Asian studies
 European studies
 Celtic studies
 German studies
 Indo-European studies
 Scandinavian studies
 Slavic studies
 Australian studies
 Pacific studies
 Middle East studies
Russian and Eastern European studies

Ethnic and cultural studies 

Cultural studies
Ethnic studies
 Ethnology
 Culturology

Cross-cultural studies
White studies
Black studies

Gender and sexuality studies 

 Androcentrism
 Feminine psychology
 Feminism
 Feminity
 Feminist theory
 Gender dysphoria
 Gender history
 Gender identity
 Gender role
 Gender studies/Gender theory
 Genderqueer
 Gynocentrism
 Heterosexism
 Human sexual behavior
 Human sexuality (outline)
 Intersex
 Masculinity
 Masculism
 Men in feminism
 Men's liberation movement
 Men's movement
 Men's rights movement
 Men's studies
 Misandry
 Misogyny
 Postfeminism
 Postgenderism
 Queer studies/Queer theory
 Sex and gender distinction
 Sex differences in psychology
 Sex education
 Sexism
 Sexology
 Third gender
 Transgender
 Women's rights
 Women's studies

Organizational studies 

 Business economics
 Business ethics
 Business studies
 Decision science
 Entrepreneurship
 Human resources management
 Industrial organization
 Management
 Organizational behavior
 Organization theory
 Project management
 Quality control
 Strategy

Political science 

 American politics
 Canadian politics
 Civics
 Comparative politics
 European studies
 Geopolitics (Political geography)
 International relations
 International organizations
 Nationalism studies
 Peace and conflict studies
 Policy studies
 Political behavior
 Political culture
 Political economy
 Political history
 Political philosophy
 Psephology
 Public administration
 Nonprofit administration
 Non-governmental organization (NGO) administration
 Public policy
 Social choice theory

Psychology 

 Abnormal psychology
 Applied psychology
 Asian psychology
 Biological psychology
 Black psychology
 Clinical psychology
 Clinical neuropsychology
 Cognitive psychology
 Community psychology
 Comparative psychology
 Conservation psychology
 Consumer psychology
 Counseling psychology
 Criminal psychology
 Cultural psychology
 Developmental psychology
 Differential psychology
 Ecological psychology
 Educational psychology
 Environmental psychology
 Evolutionary psychology
 Experimental psychology
 Group psychology
 Family psychology
 Feminine psychology
 Forensic psychology
 Forensic developmental psychology
 Health psychology
 Humanistic psychology
 Indigenous psychology
 Legal psychology
 Mathematical psychology
 Media psychology
 Medical psychology
 Military psychology
 Moral psychology and Descriptive ethics
 Music psychology
 Neuropsychology
 Occupational psychology
 Occupational health psychology
 Organizational psychology
 Parapsychology (outline)
 Pediatric psychology
 Pedology (children study)
 Personality psychology
 Phenomenology
 Political psychology
 Positive psychology
 Problem solving
 Psychoanalysis
 Psychobiology
 Psychometrics
 Psychology of religion
 Psychopathology
 Child psychopathology
 Psychophysics
 Quantitative psychology
 Rehabilitation psychology
 School psychology
 Social psychology
 Sport psychology
 Traffic psychology
 Transpersonal psychology
 Travel psychology

Sociology 

 Analytical sociology
 Applied sociology
 Political sociology
 Public sociology
 Social engineering
 Leisure studies
 Architectural sociology
 Behavioral sociology
 Chinese sociology
 Collective behavior
 Activism
 Social movements
 Social phenomenon
 Community informatics
 Social network analysis
 Comparative sociology
 Conflict theory
 Critical sociology
 Cultural sociology
 Cultural studies
 Criminology/Criminal justice (outline)
 Critical management studies
 Demography/Population
 Digital sociology
 Dramaturgical sociology
 Economic sociology
 Educational sociology
 Empirical sociology
 Environmental sociology
 Evolutionary sociology
 Feminist sociology
 Figurational sociology
 Futures studies (outline)
 Historical sociology
 Human ecology
 Humanistic sociology
 Industrial sociology
 Interactionism
 Internet sociology
 Interpretive sociology
 Phenomenology
 Ethnomethodology
 Symbolic interactionism
 Social constructionism
 Jealousy sociology
 Macrosociology
 Marxist sociology
 Mathematical sociology
 Medical sociology
 Mesosociology
 Microsociology
 Military sociology
 Natural resource sociology
 Organizational studies
 Phenomenological sociology
 Policy sociology
 Polish sociology
 Psychoanalytic sociology
 Science studies/Science and technology studies
 Sexology
 Social capital
 Social change
 Social conflict theory
 Social control
 Pure sociology
 Social economy
 Social philosophy
 Social psychology
 Social policy
 Social research
 Social transformation
 Computational sociology
 Economic sociology/Socioeconomics
 Economic development
 Social development
 Sociology of aging
 Sociology of agriculture
 Sociology of art
 Sociology of autism
 Sociology of childhood
 Sociology of conflict
 Sociology of culture
 Sociology of cyberspace
 Sociology of deviance
 Sociology of development
 Sociology of disaster
 Sociology of education
 Sociology of emotions
 Sociology of fatherhood
 Sociology of film
 Sociology of finance
 Sociology of food
 Sociology of gender
 Sociology of generations
 Sociology of globalization
 Sociology of government
 Sociology of health and illness
 Sociology of human consciousness
 Sociology of immigration
 Sociology of knowledge
 Sociology of language
 Sociology of law
 Sociology of leisure
 Sociology of literature
 Sociology of markets
 Sociology of marriage
 Sociology of motherhood
 Sociology of music
 Sociology of natural resources
 Sociology of organizations
 Sociology of peace, war, and social conflict
 Sociology of punishment
 Sociology of race and ethnic relations
 Sociology of religion
 Sociology of risk
 Sociology of science
 Sociology of scientific knowledge
 Sociology of social change
 Sociology of social movements
 Sociology of space
 Sociology of sport
 Sociology of technology
 Sociology of terrorism
 Sociology of the body
 Sociology of the family
 Sociology of the history of science
 Sociology of the Internet
 Sociology of work
 Social theory
 Social stratification
 Sociological theory
 Sociobiology
 Sociocybernetics
 Sociolinguistics
 Sociomusicology
 Structural sociology
 Theoretical sociology
 Urban studies or Urban sociology/Rural sociology
 Victimology
 Visual sociology

Natural sciences

Biology 

 Aerobiology
 Anatomy
 Comparative anatomy
 Human anatomy (outline)
 Bacteriology
 Biochemistry (outline)
 Bioinformatics
 Biophysics (outline)
 Biotechnology (outline)
 Botany (outline)
 Ethnobotany
 Phycology
 Cell biology (outline)
 Chronobiology
 Cognitive biology
 Computational biology
 Conservation biology
 Cryobiology
 Developmental biology
 Embryology
 Gerontology
 Teratology
 Ecology (outline)
 Agroecology
 Ethnoecology
 Human ecology
 Landscape ecology
 Forensic biology
 Genetics (outline)
 Behavioural genetics
 Molecular genetics
 Population genetics
 Geobiology
 Endocrinology
 Evolution (outline)
 Systematics
 Taxonomy
 Histology
 Human biology
 Immunology (outline)
 Limnology
 Linnaean taxonomy
 Marine biology
 Mathematical biology
 Microbiology
 Molecular biology
 Mycology
 Neuroscience (outline)
 Behavioral neuroscience
 Neurophysics
 Computational Neuroscience
 Nutrition (outline)
 Paleobiology
 Paleontology
 Parasitology
 Pathology
 Anatomical pathology 
 Clinical pathology
 Dermatopathology
 Forensic pathology
 Hematopathology 
 Histopathology
 Molecular pathology 
 Surgical pathology
 Phytopathology
 Physiology
 Human physiology
 Exercise physiology
 Population biology
 Psychobiology
 Quantum biology
 Sociobiology
 Structural Biology
 Systems biology
 Theoretical biology
 Toxicology
 Virology
 Molecular virology
 Xenobiology
 Zoology (outline)
 Animal communications
 Apiology
 Arachnology
 Arthropodology
 Batrachology
 Bryozoology
 Carcinology
 Cetology
 Cnidariology
 Entomology
 Forensic entomology
 Ethnozoology
 Ethology
 Helminthology
 Herpetology
 Ichthyology (outline)
 Invertebrate zoology
 Mammalogy
 Cynology
 Felinology
 Malacology
 Conchology
 Limacology
 Teuthology
 Myriapodology
 Myrmecology (outline)
 Nematology
 Neuroethology
 Oology
 Ornithology (outline)
 Planktology
 Primatology
 Zootomy
 Zoosemiotics

Chemistry 

See also Branches of chemistry

 Agrochemistry
 Analytical chemistry
 Astrochemistry
 Atmospheric chemistry
 Biochemistry (outline)
 Catalysts
 Chemical engineering (outline)
 Chemical biology
 Chemical physics
 Cheminformatics
 Computational chemistry
 Cosmochemistry
 Environmental chemistry
 Femtochemistry
 Flavor
 Flow chemistry
 Forensic chemistry
 Geochemistry
 Green chemistry
 Histochemistry
 Hydrogenation
 Immunochemistry
 Inorganic chemistry
 Marine chemistry
 Mathematical chemistry
 Mechanochemistry
 Medicinal chemistry
 Molecular biology
 Molecular mechanics
 Nanotechnology
 Natural product chemistry
 Neurochemistry
 Nuclear chemistry
 Oenology
 Organic chemistry (outline)
 Organometallic chemistry
 Petrochemistry
 Pharmacology
 Photochemistry 
 Physical chemistry
 Electrochemistry
 Physical organic chemistry
 Phytochemistry
 Polymer chemistry
 Quantum chemistry
 Radiochemistry
 Soil chemistry
 Solid-state chemistry
 Sonochemistry
 Supramolecular chemistry
 Surface chemistry
 Synthetic chemistry
 Systems chemistry
 Theoretical chemistry
 Thermochemistry

Earth sciences 

See also Branches of earth sciences

 Atmospheric science
 Climatology
 Ecology
 Edaphology
 Environmental science
 Environmental chemistry
 Forensic geology
 Gemology
 Geobiology
 Geodesy
 Geography (outline)
 Geology (outline)
 Geochemistry
 Geomorphology
 Geophysics (outline)
 Glaciology
 Hydrogeology
 Hydrology (outline)
 Meteorology (outline)
 Mineralogy
 Limnology 
 Oceanography
 Pedology
 Paleontology
 Paleobiology
 Paleoecology
 Petrology
 Planetary science (alternatively, a part of space science)
 Sedimentology
 Seismology
 Soil science
 Speleology
 Tectonics
 Volcanology

Physics 

 Acoustics (outline)
 Quantum acoustics
 Agrophysics
 Applied physics (outline)
 Accelerator physics
 Communication physics
 Astrophysics
 Atmospheric physics
 Atmospheric electricity
 Atomic, molecular, and optical physics
 Atomic physics
 Biophysics (outline)
 Neurophysics
 Chemical physics
 Classical physics
 Computational physics
 Condensed matter physics
 Cryogenics
 Digital physics
 Dynamics
 Analytical dynamics
 Astrodynamics
 Brownian dynamics
 File dynamics
 Flight dynamics
 Fluid dynamics
 Aerodynamics
 Hydrodynamics
 Fractional dynamics
 Geodynamics
 Molecular dynamics
 Newtonian dynamics
 Langevin dynamics
 Quantum chromodynamics
 Quantum electrodynamics
 Relativistic dynamics
 Stellar dynamics
 System dynamics
 Thermodynamics
 Vehicle dynamics
 Econophysics
 Electromagnetism
 Electricity
 Electrostatic
 Magnetism
 Engineering physics
 Experimental physics
 Geophysics (outline)
 Biogeophysics
 Geomagnetism
 Kinematics
 Fluid kinematics
 Relativistic kinematics
 Kinetics
 Electrokinetics
 Homeokinetics
 Laser physics
 Materials physics
 Mathematical physics
 Medical physics
 Mechanics
 Analytical mechanics
 Applied mechanics
 Ballistics
 Biomechanics
 Celestial mechanics
 Classical mechanics
 Continuum mechanics
 Fluid mechanics
 Compressible flow
 Gas mechanics
 Fracture mechanics
 Hamiltonian mechanics
 Hydraulics
 Lagrangian mechanics
 Matrix mechanics
 Molecular mechanics
 Optomechanics
 Particle mechanics
 Quantum mechanics
 Relativistic mechanics
 Relativistic quantum mechanics
 Soil mechanics
 Solid mechanics
 Statistical mechanics
 Quantum statistical mechanics
 Mineral physics
 Molecular physics
 Nuclear physics
 Optics
 Geometrical optics
 Physical optics
 Quantum optics
 Particle physics
 Petrophysics
 Photonics
 Physical chemistry
 Plasma physics
 Polymer physics
 Quantum physics
 Quantum technology
 Radiophysics
 Relativity
 General relativity
 Special relativity
 Social physics
 Soil physics
 Solid state physics
 Spintronics
 Statics
 Fluid statics
 Statistical physics
 Surface physics
 Theoretical physics
 Quantum field theory
 Quantum gravity
 Thermal physics

Space sciences 

 Aerospace engineering
 Aerospace architecture
 Aerospace physiology
 Aerospace manufacturing
 Astronautics
 Space architecture 
 Space colonization
 Space commercialization
 Space-based economy
 Space industry
 Space manufacturing
 Space tourism
 Space environment
 Space logistics
 Space food
 Space medicine
 Neuroscience in space
 Space religion
 Space sex
 Space survival
 Space warfare
 Space writing
 Aeronautics
 Control engineering
 Human spaceflight
 Robotic spacecraft
 Space corrosion
 Space technology
 Space telescopes
 Space-based radar
 Space-based solar power
 Spacecraft design
 Spacecraft propulsion
 Asteroid-impact avoidance
 Astrobiology
 Astrobotany
 Astrochemistry
 Theoretical astronomy
 Cosmochemistry
 Cosmology
 Physical cosmology
 Micro-g environment research
 Remote sensing
 Space archaeology
 Space exploration
 Space law
 Space nuclear power

Astronomy 

 Astronomy (outline)
 Archaeoastronomy
 Astrometry
 Amateur astronomy
 Forensic astronomy
 Extragalactic astronomy
 Galactic astronomy
 High-energy astronomy
 Observational astronomy
 Radio astronomy
 Microwave astronomy
 Submillimetre astronomy
 Infrared astronomy
 Optical astronomy
 UV astronomy
 X-ray astronomy
 Gamma-ray astronomy
 Cosmic-ray astronomy
 Neutrino astronomy
 Gravitational wave astronomy
 Photometry
 Spectroscopy
 Stellar astronomy
 Solar astronomy
 Astrophysics
 Celestial mechanics
 Compact objects
 Computational astrophysics
 Gravitational astronomy
 Black holes
 Interstellar medium
 Numerical simulations
 Astrophysical plasma
 Galaxy formation and evolution
 High-energy astrophysics
 Hydrodynamics
 Magnetohydrodynamics
 Star formation
 Orbital mechanics
 Physical cosmology
 Relativistic astrophysics
 Stellar astrophysics
 Helioseismology
 Solar physics
 Stellar evolution
 Stellar nucleosynthesis
 Space plasma physics
 Planetary science (alternatively, a part of earth science)
 Atmospheric science 
 Exoplanetology 
 Planetary formation 
 Planetary rings
 Magnetospheres
 Planetary geology 
 Planetary surfaces 
 Small Solar System bodies

Formal sciences

Computer sciences 

Also a branch of electrical engineering

 Theory of computation
 Automata theory (Formal languages)
 Computability theory
 Computational complexity theory
 Concurrency theory
 VLSI design
 Operating systems
 Algorithms
 Randomized algorithms
 Distributed algorithms
 Parallel algorithms
 Computational geometry
 Database
 Data structures
 Computer architecture
 Computer communications (networks)
 Information theory
 Internet, World Wide Web
 Wireless computing (Mobile computing)
 Ubiquitous computing
 Cloud computing
 Computer program
 Computer programming
 Computer security and reliability
 Cryptanalysis
 Cryptography
 Fault-tolerant computing
 Distributed computing
 Grid computing
 Parallel computing
 High-performance computing
 Quantum computing
 Computer graphics
 Image processing
 Scientific visualization
 Software engineering
 Formal methods (Formal verification)
 Programming languages
 Programming paradigms
 Imperative programming
 Object-oriented programming
 Functional programming
 Logic programming
 Concurrent programming
 Program semantics
 Type theory
 Compilers
 Human–computer interaction
 Information science (outline)
 Data management
 Data mining
 Database (outline)
 Relational database
 Distributed database
 Object database
 Information retrieval
 Information management
 Information system
 Information technology
 Knowledge management
 Multimedia, hypermedia
 Sound and music computing
 Quantum information
 Theoretical computer science
 Artificial intelligence (outline)
 Cognitive science
 Automated reasoning
 Machine learning
 Artificial neural network
 Support vector machine
 Natural language processing (Computational linguistics)
 Computer vision (outline)
 Expert systems
 Robotics (outline)
 Computing in mathematics, natural sciences, engineering, and medicine
 Numerical analysis
 Algebraic (symbolic) computation
 Computational number theory
 Computational mathematics
 Scientific computing (Computational science)
 Computational biology (bioinformatics)
 Computational physics
 Computational chemistry
 Computational neuroscience
 Computer-aided engineering
 Finite element analysis
 Computational fluid dynamics
 Computing in social sciences, arts, humanities, and professions
 Computational economics
 Computational sociology
 Computational finance
 Digital humanities (Humanities computing)
 History of computer hardware
 History of computer science (outline)
 Humanistic informatics
 Community informatics

Logic 

 Mathematical logic
 Set theory
 Proof theory
 Model theory
 Recursion theory
 Modal logic
 Intuitionistic logic

 Philosophical logic
 Logical reasoning
 Modal logic
 Deontic logic
 Doxastic logic

 Logic in computer science
 Programming language semantics
 Formal methods (Formal verification)
 Type theory
 Logic programming
 Multi-valued logic
 Fuzzy logic

Mathematics

Pure mathematics 

See also Branches of mathematics and AMS Mathematics Subject Classification

 Algebra (outline)
 Group theory
 Ring theory
 Commutative algebra
 Field theory
 Linear algebra (Vector space)
 Multilinear algebra
 Universal algebra
 Homological algebra
 Differential algebra
 Lattice theory (Order theory)
 Representation theory
 K-theory
 Category theory
 Topos theory
 Analysis
 Real analysis
 Calculus (outline)
 Complex analysis
 Functional analysis
 Operator theory
 Non-standard analysis
 Harmonic analysis
 Fourier analysis
 p-adic analysis
 Ordinary differential equations
 Partial differential equations
 Probability theory
 Measure theory
 Integral geometry
 Ergodic theory
 Stochastic process
 Geometry (outline) and Topology
 General topology
 Algebraic topology
 Geometric topology
 Differential topology
 Algebraic geometry
 Projective geometry
 Affine geometry
 Non-Euclidean geometry
 Convex geometry
 Discrete geometry
 Integral geometry
 Euclidean geometry
 Finite geometry
 Galois geometry
 Noncommutative geometry
 Solid geometry
 Trigonometry
 Number theory
 Analytic number theory
 Algebraic number theory
 Geometric number theory
 Arithmetic
 Arithmetic combinatorics
 Logic and Foundations of mathematics
 Set theory
 Proof theory
 Model theory
 Recursion theory
 Modal logic
 Intuitionistic logic

Applied mathematics 

 Approximation theory
 Computational mathematics
 Numerical analysis
 Operations research
 Mathematical optimization
 Linear programming
 Dynamic programming
 Assignment problem
 Decision analysis
 Inventory theory
 Scheduling
 Real options analysis
 Systems analysis
 Stochastic processes
 Optimal maintenance
 Dynamical systems
 Chaos theory
 Fractal geometry
 Mathematical physics
 Quantum mechanics
 Quantum field theory
 Quantum gravity
 String theory
 Statistical mechanics
 Theory of computation
 Computational complexity theory
 Information theory
 Cryptography
 Steganography
 Combinatorics (outline)
 Coding theory
 Graph theory
 Game theory

Statistics 

 Mathematical statistics
 Econometrics
 Actuarial science
 Demography
 Computational statistics
 Data mining
 Regression (outline)
 Simulation
 Bootstrap (statistics)
 Design of experiments
 Block design and Analysis of variance
 Response surface methodology
 Sample Survey
 Sampling theory
 Statistical modelling
 Biostatistics
 Epidemiology
 Multivariate analysis
 Structural equation model
 Time series
 Reliability theory
 Quality control
 Statistical theory
 Decision theory
 Mathematical statistics
 Probability (outline)

 Survey methodology

Systems science 

 Network science
 Chaos theory
 Conceptual systems
 Communications system
 Complex systems
 Complex system
 Cybernetics
 Biocybernetics
 Engineering cybernetics
 Management cybernetics
 Medical cybernetics
 New cybernetics
 Second-order cybernetics
 Sociocybernetics
 Control theory
 Affect control theory
 Control engineering
 Control systems
 Dynamical systems
 Perceptual control theory
 Operations research
 Systems biology
 Computational systems biology
 Synthetic biology
 Systems immunology
 Systems neuroscience
 Systems chemistry
 System dynamics
 Social dynamics
 Systems ecology
 Ecosystem ecology
 Systems engineering
 Biological systems engineering
 Earth systems engineering and management
 Enterprise systems engineering
 Systems analysis
 Systems theory in anthropology
 Systems psychology
 Ergonomics
 Family systems theory
 Systemic therapy
 Systems theory
 Biochemical systems theory
 Ecological systems theory
 Developmental systems theory
 General systems theory
 Living systems theory
 LTI system theory
 Sociotechnical systems theory
 Mathematical system theory
 World-systems theory

Professions and applied sciences

Agriculture 

 Aeroponics
 Agroecology
 Agrology
 Agronomy
 Animal husbandry (Animal science)
 Beekeeping (Apiculture)
 Anthroponics
 Agricultural economics
 Agricultural engineering
 Biological systems engineering
 Food engineering
 Aquaculture
 Aquaponics
 Enology
 Entomology
 Fogponics
 Food science
 Culinary arts
 Forestry
 Horticulture
 Hydrology (outline)
 Hydroponics
 Pedology
 Plant science (outline)
 Pomology
 Pest control
 Purification
 Viticulture

Architecture and design 

 Architecture (outline) 
 Interior architecture
 Landscape architecture
 Architectural analytics
 Historic preservation
 Interior design (interior architecture)
 Landscape architecture (landscape planning)
 Landscape design
 Urban planning (urban design)
 Visual communication
 Graphic design
 Type design
 Technical drawing
 Industrial design (product design)
 Ergonomics (outline)
 Toy and amusement design
 User experience design
 Interaction design
 Information architecture
 User interface design
 User experience evaluation
 Decorative arts
 Fashion design
 Textile design

Business 

 Accounting
 Accounting research
 Accounting scholarship
 Business administration
 Business analysis
 Business ethics
 Business law
 E-Business
 Entrepreneurship
 Finance (outline)
 Industrial and labor relations
 Collective bargaining
 Human resources
 Organizational studies
 Labor economics
 Labor history
 Information systems (Business informatics)
 Management information systems
 Health informatics
 Information technology (outline)
 International trade
 Management (outline)
 Marketing (outline)
 Operations management
 Purchasing
 Risk management and insurance
 Systems science

Divinity 

 Canon law
 Church history
 Field ministry
 Pastoral counseling
 Pastoral theology
 Religious education techniques
 Homiletics
 Liturgy
 Sacred music
 Missiology
 Hermeneutics
 Scriptural study and languages
 Biblical Hebrew
 Biblical studies/Sacred scripture
Vedic Study
 New Testament Greek
 Latin
 Old Church Slavonic
 Theology (outline)
 Dogmatic theology
 Ecclesiology
 Sacramental theology
 Systematic theology
 Christian ethics
Hindu ethics
 Moral theology
 Historical theology

Education 

 Comparative education
 Critical pedagogy
 Curriculum and instruction
 Alternative education
 Early childhood education
 Elementary education
 Secondary education
 Higher education
 Mastery learning
 Cooperative learning
 Agricultural education
 Art education
 Bilingual education
 Chemistry education
 Counselor education
 Language education
 Legal education
 Mathematics education
 Medical education
 Military education and training
 Music education
 Nursing education
 Outdoor education
 Peace education
 Physical education/Sports coaching
 Physics education
 Reading education
 Religious education
 Science education
 Special education
 Sex education
 Sociology of education
 Technology education
 Vocational education
 Educational leadership
 Educational philosophy
 Educational psychology
 Educational technology
 Distance education

Engineering and technology 

Chemical engineering
 Biocatalysts
 Bioengineering
 Biochemical engineering
 Biomolecular engineering
 Bionics
 Catalysis
 Materials engineering
 Molecular engineering
 Nanotechnology
 Polymer engineering
 Process design
 Petroleum engineering
 Nuclear engineering
 Food engineering
 Process engineering
 Reaction engineering
 Thermodynamics
 Transport phenomena

Civil engineering
 Agricultural engineering
 Coastal engineering
 Construction
 Earthquake engineering
 Ecological engineering
 Environmental engineering
 Geotechnical engineering
 Engineering geology
 Hydraulic engineering
 Infrastructure
 Mining engineering
 Transportation engineering
 Highway engineering
 Structural engineering
 Architectural engineering
 Structural mechanics
 Surveying

Electrical engineering
 Applied physics
 Computer engineering (outline)
 Computer science
 Control systems engineering
 Control theory
 Electronic engineering
 Electronics
 Instrumentation engineering
 Engineering physics
 Photonics
 Information theory
 Mechatronics
 Power engineering
 Robotics (outline)
 Microbotics
 Semiconductors
 Telecommunications engineering
 Quantum computing

Materials science and engineering
 Biomaterials
 Ceramic engineering
 Corrosion engineering
 Crystallography
 Nanomaterials
 Photonics
 Physical metallurgy
 Polymer engineering
 Polymer science
 Semiconductors

Mechanical engineering
 Aerospace engineering
Aeronautics 
Astronautics 
 Acoustical engineering
 Automotive engineering
 Biomedical engineering
 Biomechanical engineering
 Continuum mechanics
 Fluid mechanics
 Heat transfer
 Industrial engineering
 Manufacturing engineering
 Marine engineering
 Mass transfer
 Mechatronics
 Nanoengineering
 Ocean engineering
 Optical engineering
 Robotics
 Thermal engineering
 Thermodynamics

Environmental studies and forestry 

 Environmental management
 Coastal management
 Fisheries management
 Land management
 Natural resource management
 Waste management
 Wildlife management

 Environmental policy
 Wildlife observation
 Recreation ecology
 Silviculture
 Sustainability studies
 Sustainable development
 Toxicology
 Ecology

Family and consumer science 

 

 Consumer education
 Housing
 Interior design

 Nutrition (outline)
 Foodservice management
 Textiles

Human physical performance and recreation 

 Biomechanics / Sports biomechanics
 Sports coaching
 Escapology
 Ergonomics
 Physical fitness
 Aerobics
 Personal trainer / Personal fitness training
 Game design
 Exercise physiology
 Kinesiology / Exercise physiology / Performance science
 Leisure studies
 Navigation
 Outdoor activity
 Physical activity
 Physical education / Pedagogy
 Sociology of sport
 Sexology
 Sports / exercise
 Sports journalism / sportscasting
 Sport management
 Athletic director
 Sport psychology
 Sports medicine
 Athletic training
 Survival skills
 Batoning
 Bushcraft
 Scoutcraft
 Woodcraft
 Toy and amusement design

Journalism, media studies and communication 

 Journalism (outline)
 Broadcast journalism
 Digital journalism
 Literary journalism
 New media journalism
 Print journalism
 Sports journalism / sportscasting
 Media studies (Mass media)
 Newspaper
 Magazine
 Radio (outline)
 Television (outline)
 Television studies
 Film (outline)
 Film studies
 Game studies
 Fan studies
 Narratology
 Internet (outline)
 Communication studies
 Advertising
 Animal communication
 Communication design
 Conspiracy theory
 Digital media
 Electronic media
 Environmental communication
 Hoax
 Information theory
 Intercultural communication
 Marketing (outline)
 Mass communication
 Nonverbal communication
 Organizational communication
 Popular culture studies
 Propaganda
 Public relations (outline)
 Speech communication
 Technical writing
 Translation

Law 

 Legal management (academic discipline)
 Corporate law
 Mercantile law
 Business law
 Administrative law
 Canon law
 Comparative law
 Constitutional law
 Competition law
 Criminal law
 Criminal procedure
 Criminal justice (outline)
 Police science
 Forensic science (outline)
 Islamic law
 Jewish law (outline)
 Jurisprudence (Philosophy of Law)
 Civil law
 Admiralty law
 Animal law/Animal rights
 Common law
 Corporations
 Civil procedure
 Contract law
 Environmental law
 Family law
 Federal law
 International law
 Public international law
 Supranational law
 Labor law
 Paralegal studies
 Property law
 Tax law
 Tort law (outline)
 Law enforcement (outline)
 Procedural law
 Substantive law

Library and museum studies 

 Archival science
 Archivist
 Bibliographic databases
 Bibliometrics
 Bookmobile
 Cataloging
 Citation analysis
 Categorization
 Classification
 Library classification
 Taxonomic classification
 Scientific classification
 Statistical classification
 Security classification
 Film classification
 Collections care
 Collection management
 Collection Management Policy
 Conservation science
 Conservation and restoration of cultural heritage
 Curator
 Data storage
 Database management
 Data modeling
 Digital preservation
 Dissemination
 Film preservation
 Five laws of library science
 Historic preservation
 History of library science
 Human-computer interaction
 Indexer
 Informatics
 Information architecture
 Information broker 
 Information literacy
 Information retrieval
 Information science (outline)
 Information systems and technology
 Integrated library system
 Interlibrary loan
 Knowledge engineering
 Knowledge management
 Library
 Library binding
 Library circulation
 Library instruction
 Library portal
 Library technical services
 Management
 Mass deacidification
 Museology
 Museum education
 Museum administration
 Object conservation
 Preservation
 Prospect research
 Readers' advisory
 Records management
 Reference
 Reference desk
 Reference management software
 Registrar
 Research methods
 Slow fire
 Special library
 Statistics

Medicine 

 Alternative medicine
 Anesthesiology
 Cleaning
 Clinical laboratory sciences/Clinical pathology/Laboratory medicine
 Clinical biochemistry
 Cytogenetics
 Cytohematology
 Cytology (outline)
 Haemostasiology
 Histology
 Clinical immunology
 Clinical microbiology
 Molecular genetics
 Parasitology
 Clinical physiology
 Cosmetology
 Decontamination
 Dentistry (outline)
 Dental hygiene and epidemiology
 Dental surgery
 Endodontics
 Orthodontics
 Oral and maxillofacial surgery
 Periodontics
 Prosthodontics
 Implantology
 Dermatology
 Emergency medicine (outline)
 Health informatics/Clinical informatics
 Music therapy
 Nursing
 Nutrition (outline) and dietetics
 Optometry
 Orthoptics
 Osteopathy
 Physiotherapy
 Occupational therapy
 Speech and language pathology
 Internal medicine
 Preventive medicine
 Cardiology
 Cardiac electrophysiology
 Dermatology
 Pulmonology
 Medical toxicology
 Endocrinology
 Gastroenterology
 Hepatology
 Oncology
 Geriatrics
 Gynaecology
 Hematology
 Infectious disease
 Nephrology
 Neurology
 Neurosurgery
 Obstetrics (outline)
 Ophthalmology
 Neuro-ophthalmology
 Orthopedic surgery
 Otolaryngology
 Pathology
 Pediatrics
 Pharmacy
 Pharmaceutical sciences
 Pharmacognosy
 Physical fitness
 Aerobics
 Personal fitness training
 Kinesiology / Exercise physiology / Performance science
 Physical therapy
 Podiatry
 Primary care
 General practice
 Psychiatry (outline)
 Psychology (outline)
 Psychosomatic
 Psychotherapy
 Public health
 Radiology
 Recreation therapy
 Rehabilitation medicine
 Respiratory medicine
 Pulmonology
 Sleep medicine
 Respiratory therapy
 Rheumatology
 Sports medicine
 Sterilization (microbiology)
 Surgery
 Bariatric surgery
 Cardiothoracic surgery
 Neurosurgery
 Plastic surgery
 Trauma surgery
 Traumatology
 Traditional medicine
 Therapy
 Urology
 Andrology
 Veterinary medicine

Military sciences 

 Amphibious warfare
 Artillery
 Battlespace
 Air
 Information
 Land
 Sea
 Space
 Campaigning
 Military engineering
 Doctrine
 Espionage
 Game theory
Grand strategy
 Containment
Limited war
 Military science (outline)
 Philosophy of war
 Strategic studies
 Total war
 War (outline)
 Leadership
 Logistics
 Materiel
 Supply chain management
 Military operation
 Military history
 Prehistoric
 Ancient
 Medieval
 Early modern
 Industrial
 Modern
 Fourth-generation warfare
 Military intelligence
 Military law
 Military medicine
 Naval science
 Naval engineering
 Naval tactics
 Naval architecture
Organization
 Command and control
 Doctrine
 Education and training
 Engineers
 Intelligence
 Ranks
 Staff
 Technology and equipment
 Military exercises
 Military simulation
 Military sports
 Strategy
 Attrition
 Deception
 Defensive
 Offensive
 Counter-offensive
 Maneuver
 Goal
 Naval
 Tactics
 Aerial
 Battle
 Cavalry
 Charge
 Counter-attack
 Counter-insurgency
 Counter-intelligence
 Counter-terrorism
 Foxhole
 Endemic warfare
 Guerrilla warfare
 Infiltration
 Irregular warfare
 Morale
 Naval tactics
 Siege
 Surgical strike
 Tactical objective
 Trench warfare
 Military weapons
 Armor
 Artillery
 Biological
 Cavalry
 Conventional
 Chemical
 Cyber
 Economic
 Electronic
 Infantry
 Nuclear
 Psychological
 Unconventional
 Other Military
 Arms control
 Arms race
 Assassination
 Asymmetric warfare
 Civil defense
 Clandestine operation
 Collateral damage
 Cold war (general term)
 Combat
 Covert operation
 Cyberwarfare
 Defense industry
 Disarmament
 Intelligence agency
 Laws of war
 Mercenary
 Military campaign
 Military operation
 Mock combat
 Network-centric warfare
 Paramilitary
 Principles of war
 Private defense agency
 Private military company
 Proxy war
 Religious war
 Security
 Special forces
 Special operations
 Theater (warfare)
 Theft
 Undercover
 War crimes
 Warrior

Public administration 

 Civil service
 Corrections
 Conservation biology
 Criminal justice (outline)
 Disaster research
 Disaster response
 Emergency management
 Emergency services
 Fire safety (Structural fire protection)
 Fire ecology (Wildland fire management)
 Governmental affairs
 International affairs
 Law enforcement
 Peace and conflict studies
 Police science
 Policy studies
 Policy analysis
 Public administration
 Nonprofit administration
 Non-governmental organization (NGO) administration
 Public policy doctrine
 Public policy school
 Regulation
 Public safety
 Public service

Public policy 

 Agricultural policy
 Commercial policy
 Cultural policy
 Domestic policy
 Drug policy
 Drug policy reform
 Economic policy
 Fiscal policy
 Incomes policy
 Industrial policy
 Investment policy
 Monetary policy
 Tax policy
 Education policy
 Energy policy
 Nuclear energy policy
 Renewable energy policy
 Environmental policy
 Food policy
 Foreign policy
 Health policy
 Pharmaceutical policy
 Vaccination policy
 Housing policy
 Immigration policy
 Knowledge policy
 Language policy
 Military policy
 Science policy
 Climate change policy
 Stem cell research policy
 Space policy
 Technology policy
 Security policy
 Social policy
 Public policy by country

Social work 

 Child welfare
 Community practice
 Community organizing
 Social policy
 Human Services
 Corrections
 Gerontology
 Medical social work
 Mental health
 School social work

Transportation 

 Highway safety
 Infographics
 Intermodal transportation studies
 Logistics
 Marine transportation
 Port management
 Seafaring
 Operations research
 Mass transit
 Travel
 Vehicles

See also 

 Academia (outline)
 Academic genealogy
 Curriculum
 Interdisciplinarity
 Knowledge organization
 Transdisciplinarity
 Classification of Instructional Programs
 Joint Academic Coding System
 List of fields of doctoral studies in the United States
 Outline of academic disciplines

Notes

References

 
 
 US Department of Education Institute of Education Sciences.  Classification of Instructional Programs (CIP).  National Center for Education Statistics.

External links 
 Classification of Instructional Programs (CIP 2000): Developed by the U.S. Department of Education's National Center for Education Statistics to provide a taxonomic scheme that will support the accurate tracking, assessment, and reporting of fields of study and program completions activity.
 Complete JACS (Joint Academic Classification of Subjects) from Higher Education Statistics Agency (HESA) in the United Kingdom
 Australian and New Zealand Standard Research Classification (ANZSRC 2008) (web-page) Chapter 3 and Appendix 1: Fields of research classification.
 Fields of Knowledge, a zoomable map allowing the academic disciplines and sub-disciplines in this article be visualised.
 Interactive Historical Atlas of the Disciplines, University of Geneva

 
Education-related lists
Science-related lists
Higher education-related lists